Jesús Orozco may refer to:
 Jesús Orozco (Venezuelan footballer) (born 2001)
 Jesús Orozco (Mexican footballer) (born 2002)